The Bandini 1100, introduced in 1946 by Ilario Bandini, was the first car to wear the Bandini badge. A similar model with the same name was produced afterwards from 1947-1950.

The chassis 

The Fiat steel frame was modified to carry independent suspension with front torsion bar. At the rear, hydraulic drum brakes were placed next to the differential, attached to a frame also fitted with elastic suspension elements borrowed from a Gilera motorcycle, shock absorbers and a clutch system articulation lever adapted from a door closing device salvaged from a local pub.

The aluminium bodywork was done by Rocco Motto. It was a one-piece two-seater with an elegant, sinuous, sporting shape. The large center-mounted  grille was made up of seventeen vertical bars, and was flanked by large headlights. The streamlined broad front defines the lines that drop to the rear wheels affecting even the doors. Instead of a fixed windshield, Bandini chose to fit two "slides". The rear wheels are particularly pronounced, while the rear is low and tapered. The wheels are Borrani wires.

The engine 
The engine is the original Fiat 1100, tuned by Bandini.

 Engine: longitudinal front-mounted 4-cylinder in-line 
 Displacement: 
 Bore and stroke:  x 
 Maximum power: unknown

See also
 Ilario Bandini
 Bandini Automobili

Bandini vehicles
Cars introduced in 1946